Chalinolobus is a genus of bats, commonly known as pied, wattled, or long-tailed bats. They have fleshy lobes at the bottom edge of their ears and on their lower lips. The bats otherwise classified in the genus Glauconycteris are included in Chalinolobus by some zoologists.

Species
 Large-eared pied bat (Chalinolobus dwyeri)
 Gould's wattled bat (Chalinolobus gouldii)
 Chocolate wattled bat (Chalinolobus morio)
 New Caledonia wattled bat (Chalinolobus neocaledonicus), sometimes treated as a subspecies of C. gouldii
 Hoary wattled bat  (Chalinolobus nigrogriseus)
 Little pied bat (Chalinolobus picatus)
 New Zealand long-tailed bat or long-tailed wattled bat (Chalinolobus tuberculatus)

References

External links
 
 "Chalinolobus pied bats, wattled bats, and relatives". Animal Diversity Web. University of Michigan. Retrieved January 31, 2019.

 
Bat genera
Taxa named by Wilhelm Peters